The Warmer Damm is a public park in the centre of Wiesbaden, Germany, stretching from the Wilhelmstraße to  the southern borders of the Kurpark and lying immediately in front of the Hessian State Theater. It was created between 1860 and 1861 as an English landscape park and includes a pond.

Gallery

References 
The information in this article is based on that in its German equivalent.

Urban public parks
Gardens in Hesse
Gardens in Germany
Tourist attractions in Wiesbaden
Culture in Wiesbaden
Continental gardens in the English Landscape Garden style